A Fallen Temple is the fourth full-length album by the Greek death metal band Septic Flesh. In 2013, a reissue containing bonus tracks and new artwork was released. This was the first Septic Flesh release since 1991's "Temple of the Lost Race" to feature a human drummer.

Track listing
All lyrics written by Sotiris V., except where noted

Personnel 
 Septic Flesh – producer
 Spiros Antoniou – bass, vocals, artwork
 Sotiris V. – guitars, vocals, keyboards
 Christos Antoniou – guitars, keyboards

 Additional musicians 
 Natalie Rassoulis – female vocals
 Kostas Tzanokostakis – clean vocals
 Kostas – drums (session)

 Production 
 Lambros Sfiris – producer, engineering

References 

1998 albums
Septicflesh albums
Albums with cover art by Spiros Antoniou
Season of Mist albums
Holy Records albums
Albums by Greek artists